The Dutch Golden Age was a period in Dutch history, roughly equivalent to the 17th century, in which Dutch trade, science and art were top ranking in the world until Tulip Mania in 1637 and onwards.

The accompanying article about the Dutch Golden Age focuses on society, religion and culture. There are also articles about the Eighty Years' War (the Dutch revolt against Spain) and the Anglo-Dutch Wars.  A concise broader picture is painted in History of the Netherlands.

People are listed here per category in order of year of birth.

Note: Many Dutchmen from this period had a middle name ending in szoon, which means son of. It is also commonly written as sz., for instance Rembrandt Harmensz. van Rijn.

Sciences and philosophy 

Carolus Clusius (1526–1609), Flemish doctor and botanist
Jan Leeghwater (1575–1650), hydraulic engineer
Willebrord Snellius (1580–1626), Dutch astronomer and mathematician
Hugo Grotius (1583–1645), Dutch jurist and philosopher, who laid the foundations for international law
Isaac Beeckman (1588–1637), Dutch philosopher
David Gorlaeus (1591-1612), Dutch natural philosopher and proponent of atomism
Jan Amos Comenius (1592–1670), Czech educator and writer 
René Descartes (1596–1650), French philosopher lived in Holland from 1628 to 1649
Franciscus Sylvius (1614–1672), German-born Dutch physician
Frans van Schooten (1615–1660), Dutch mathematician 
Johannes Phocylides Holwarda (1618-1651), Dutch natural philosopher and proponent of atomism
John Locke (1632–1704), English philosopher, exiled in Holland (1683–1688)
Nicolas Steno (1638–1686), Danish Catholic bishop and scientist
Menno van Coehoorn (1641–1704), Dutch military engineer
Christiaan Huygens (1629–1695), Dutch mathematician, physicist and astronomer
Jan Swammerdam (1637–1680), Dutch biologist and microscopist
Frederik Ruysch (1638–1731), Dutch botanist and anatomist
Regnier de Graaf (1641–1673), Dutch physician and anatomist
Pierre Bayle (1647–1706), French philosopher and writer
Simon Stevin  (1548–1620), Flemish-Dutch mathematician and engineer
Baruch de Spinoza (1632–1677), Dutch Jewish philosopher
Anton van Leeuwenhoek (1632–1723), Dutch scientist and businessman, first microbiologist
Nicolaes Tulp (1593–1674), doctor, magistrate, and mayor of Amsterdam
Bernard Mandeville (1670–1733), Dutch philosopher, political economist and satirist
Cornelis Corneliszoon (1550–ca. 1600), inventor of the wind-powered sawmill
Govert Bidloo (1649–1713), physician, anatomist and author who wrote the anatomical atlas Anatomia Humani Corporis
Frederik de Wit (1630–1706), engraver, cartographer and publisher
Petrus Plancius (1552–1622), Dutch astronomer and cartographer
Jodocus Hondius (1563–1612), Flemish-Dutch cartographer 
Willem Blaeu (1571–1638), Dutch cartographer
Joan Blaeu (1596–1673), Dutch cartographer, Willem Blaeu's son

Religion 
Jacobus Arminius (1560–1609), Dutch theologian, served from 1603 as professor in theology at the University of Leiden
Gerardus Vossius (1577-1649), Dutch theologian and humanist
Gisbertus Voetius (1589-1676), Dutch theologian, served from 1634 as professor in theology at the University of Utrecht. Noted opponent of Cartesianism.

Painting 

The best known Dutch painters of the 17th century include:
Frans Hals (ca. 1583–1666), portraits, schutterstukken, regent groups, genre pieces (inns, figures)
Hendrick Avercamp (1585–1634), landscapes with snow
Hendrick Terbruggen (1588–1629), historical and biblical paintings
Willem Claeszoon Heda (1594–1680), still lifes
Jan van Goyen (1596–1656), landscapes
Pieter Jansz Saenredam (1597–1665), church interiors, cityscapes
Salomon van Ruysdael (ca. 1600–1670), landscapes
Adriaen Brouwer (c. 1605–1638), genre pieces (inns)
Rembrandt Harmenszoon van Rijn (1606–1669), historical and biblical paintings, portraits, schutterstukken, regent groups,  genre pieces (figures)
Jan Lievens (1607–1674), historical and biblical paintings, portraits
Adriaen van Ostade (1610–1684), genre scenes of peasant life
Willem van de Velde, the elder (ca. 1611–1693), seascapes
Bartholomeus van der Helst (1613–1670), portraits, schutterstukken, regent groups
Jan Both (1615–1652), Italian landscapes
Govert Flinck (1615–1660), historical and biblical paintings, portraits, schutterstukken
Ferdinand Bol (1616–1680), historical and biblical paintings
Emanuel de Witte (ca. 1617–1692), church interiors
Gerard Terborch (1617–1681), portraits, genre pieces (family scenes)
Philips Wouwermans (1619–1668), landscapes
Aelbert Cuyp (1620–1691), Italian and Dutch landscapes
Carel Fabritius (1622–1654), historical and biblical paintings, genre pieces (figures)
Paulus Potter (1625–1654), animals in landscapes
Jan Steen (1626–1679), genre pieces (inns, family scenes)
Jacob Isaakszoon van Ruisdael (c. 1628–1682)
Gabriel Metsu (1629–1667), genre pieces (family scenes)
Pieter de Hooch (1629–1683), genre pieces (family scenes)
Johannes Vermeer (1632–1675), cityscapes, genre pieces (family scenes)
Nicolaes Maes (1634–1693), portraits, genre pieces (family scenes, figures)
Meindert Hobbema (1638–1709), landscapes

For a more comprehensive listing, see the List of Dutch painters.

Less famous painters from this period were:
Cornelis Ketel (1548–1616), portraits, schutterstukken
Hendrik Goltzius (1558–1617), landscapes
Abraham Bloemaert (1564–1651), historical and biblical paintings, landscapes
Michiel Janszoon van Miereveld (1567–1641),  portraits
Johannes Anthoniszoon van Ravesteyn (ca. 1570 – 1657), portraits
Ambrosius Bosschaert (1573–1621), flowers
Floris Claeszoon van Dijck (1575–1651), still lifes
Roelant Savery (1576–1639), landscapes
Cornelis van der Voort (1576–1624), portraits, schuttersstukken
Jan Pynas (ca. 1580–1633), historical and biblical paintings
Pieter Pieterszoon Lastman (1583–1633), historical and biblical paintings
Jan Porcellis (1584–1632), sea sights
Cornelis van Poelenburgh (1586–1667), Italian landscapes
Hercules Seghers (ca. 1589–1638), landscapes
Gerhard van Honthorst (1590–1656), historical and biblical paintings, genre pieces (family scenes, figures)
Dirck van Baburen (ca. 1590–1624), genre pieces (figures)
Cornelis Hendrickszoon Vroom (ca. 1591–1661), sea sights
Esayas van der Velde (ca. 1591–1630), landscapes
Dirck Hals (1591–1656), genre pieces (family scenes, figures)
Willem Pieterszoon Buytewech (ca. 1591–1624), landscapes, genre pieces (figures)
Cornelis Corneliszoon van Haarlem (1592–1638), portraits, historical and biblical paintings
Balthasar van der Ast (ca. 1593–1657), flowers
Pieter de Molijn (1595–1661), landscapes
Thomas de Keyser (ca. 1596–1667), portraits, schutterstukken
Johannes Corneliszoon Verspronck (1597–1662), portraits
Pieter Claesz (ca. 1597–1660), still lifes
Bartholomeus Breenbergh (1599–1657), Italian landscapes
Pieter Franszoon de Grebber (c. 1600–1652), historical and biblical paintings
Gerrit Hoeckgeest (ca. 1600–1661), church interiors
Simon de Vlieger (1601–1653), sea sights
Aert van der Neer (1603–1677), sea sights
Christiaen van Couwenbergh (1604–1667), historical and biblical paintings
Jan Davidszoon de Heem (1606–ca.1683), still lifes
Judith Leyster (1609–1660), genre pieces (figures)
Jan Asselyn (1610–1652), Italian landscapes
David Teniers the Younger (1610–1690), genre pieces (inns)
Jan Miense Molenaer (ca. 1610–1668), genre pieces (family scenes)
Pieter de Ringh (1615–1660), still lifes
Caesar van Everdingen (1617–1678), historical and biblical paintings
Willem Kalf (1619–1693), still lifes
Philips Koninck (1619–1688), landscapes
Otto Marseus van Schrieck (c. 1619–1678), flowers
Nicolaes Pieterszoon Berchem (1621–1683), Italian landscapes
Abraham van Beyeren (ca. 1620–1690), still lifes
Jan Baptist Weenix (1621–1663), Italian landscapes
Gerbrand van den Eeckhout (1621–1674)
Karel Dujardin (1622–1678), Italian landscapes
Adam Pynacker (1622–1673), Italian landscapes
Jan van de Cappelle (1626–1679), seascapes
Job Adriaenszoon Berckheyde (1630–1693), church interiors
Willem Drost (1630–1680), historical and biblical paintings
Frederik de Moucheron (1633–1686), Italian landscapes
Jan de Baen (1633–1702), portraits
Willem van de Velde the younger (1633–1707), sea sights
Frans van Mieris sr. (1635–1681), genre pieces (family scenes, figures)
Adriaen van de Velde (1636–1672), landscapes
Gerrit Adriaenszoon Berckheyde (1636–1698), cityscapes
Jan van der Heyden (1637–1712), cityscapes
Caspar Netscher (1639–1684), portraits
Gerard de Lairesse (1641–1711), historical and biblical paintings
Aert de Gelder (1645–1727), historical and biblical paintings
Jan van Huysum (1682–1749), flowers
Hendrik Martenszoon Sorgh (1609/1611–1670)
Abraham Danielsz Hondius  (c. 1625–1695), dogs, hunting scenes and landscapes

Architecture 
The most famous Dutch architects of the 17th century were :
Lieven de Key (1560–1627), master builder of Haarlem; still used a fair amount of ornamentation, built De Waag (1598), front of the Town Hall (1597), De Vleeshal (1602–1603), New Church tower (1613), all of which are in Haarlem
Hendrick de Keyser (1565–1621), preferred a style that was much more sober than his contemporary Lieven de Key, built the Zuiderkerk (1606–1614), the Westerkerk (1620–1638) and the Exchange (1608–1611) in Amsterdam, Town Hall of Delft (1619), several canal houses in Amsterdam (see also section sculpture)
Jacob van Campen (1595–1657), embraced classicism fully and served as an example for many colleagues, built the Mauritshuis in The Hague (1635), the Dam Palace in Amsterdam (1648–1655), which was originally the town hall, now a royal palace

Less famous architects from this period were:
Hans Vredeman de Vries (1527–1606), architect in Antwerp, used a lot of ornamentation
Arent van 's-Gravenzande (..-1662), built De Lakenhal (1639) and the Marekerk (1638–1640), both in Leiden, and the Oostkerk (1646) in Middelburg
Philip Vingboons (1607–1678), built many canal houses in Amsterdam in classicistic style
Pieter Post (1608–1669), built Huis ten Bosch in The Hague (1645-)
Adriaen Dortsman (1625–1682), built the Lutheran Church in Amsterdam
Elias Bouman (1636–1686), built the Portuguese-Israelitic Synagogue in Amsterdam (1671/1675)
Maurits Post (1645–1677), built Slot Amerongen (1676)

Literature 

The most famous Dutch men of letters of the 17th century were: 
Joost van den Vondel (1587–1679),  poet and playwright, who wrote more than 30 plays, many of those based on biblical stories. After The Gijsbrecht (see above) his best known drama is Lucifer (1654). He translated many French, Italian, Latin and Greek works. A recurring theme is man's inner conflicts, on the one hand rebellious, on the other hand pledging obedience to God.
Gerbrand Adriaensz. Bredero (1585–1618), poet (sonnets) and dramatist (comedies), his most famous comedy, De Spaanse Brabander (English: The Spanish Brabanter), describes the seamy side of life in Amsterdam
Pieter Corneliszoon Hooft (1581–1647), historian, poet and dramatist, who wrote Nederlandsche Historiën (English: Dutch History), which was never completed, but highly valued. His poetry was of high standard as well. He introduced French and Italian lyricism into Dutch poetry.
Jacob Cats (1577–1660), poet, famous for his moralistic writings. Houwelijck and Trouringh (English:Marriage and Wedding ring) are two major volumes to educate the Dutch about these serious affairs. Indeed, his all too serious tone, lacking humour and esprit, made him a lesser writer than the three named above, and sometimes the object of mockery. His Kinderen zijn hinderen (English: Children are a nuisance) is still a Dutch saying, often followed by the remark that Cats probably had forgotten that he had been a child himself.

Less famous literary men from this period were:
Roemer Visscher (1547–1620), writer of epigrams and emblemata
Karel van Mander (1548–1606), wrote the Schilderboeck, a book about painting, and also several biographies about painters
Justus de Harduyn (1582–1636), poet from the southern Low Countries
Samuel Coster (1579–1665), good friend of Bredero, founder of the First Dutch Academy in 1617
Jacob Revius (1586–1658), poet but worked also on the new bible translation known as the Statenbijbel that appeared in 1637 and is still in use today in some Protestant circles
Thomas Asseleyn (1620–1701), writer of comedies
Willem Godschalk van Focquenbroch (1640–1670), poet and playwright
Jan Luyken (1649–1712)

Sculpture 
Dutch sculptors of the 17th century were: 
Hendrick de Keyser (1565–1621), also an architect (see above). He created the Mausoleum for William of Orange in the Nieuwe Kerk (English: New Church) in Delft (1614). All ruling descendants of Willem of Orange and their kin have been interred here to this date. De Keyser also created the statue of Erasmus in Rotterdam (1618)
Artus I Quellinus (1609–1668), Artus II Quellinus (his nephew) (1625–1700) and Rombout Verhulst (1625–1696). All originating from the southern Netherlands (present day Belgium), they were the most prominent sculptors in the Northern Netherlands. Among their greatest works is the decoration of the Amsterdam city hall (built between 1648 and 1665), now known as the Royal Palace of Amsterdam.

Music 
The most famous Dutch composers of the 17th century were:
Jan P. Sweelinck (1562–1621), composer and organ player, major force in the development of 17th century organ music
Constantijn Huygens (1596–1687), more famous as a poet, member of the famous chamber of rhetoric De Muiderkring, composed some 800 pieces, most of which got lost, promoted use of the organ during church services

Less famous composers/musicians from this period were:
Gerbrand Adriaenszoon Bredero, songwriter
Adrianus Valerius (1570–1625), songwriter
Jacob van Eyck (1590–1657), composer
Cornelis Schuyt (1557–1616), composer
Joan Albert Ban (1597–1644), composer
Cornelis Padbrué (1592–1670), composer
Joan Schenk (1656-1612+), composer
Karel Hacquart (ca 1640-ca 1730), composer
François (1609–1667) and Pierre (1619–1680) Hemony (brothers), famous carillon builders

Exploration 
Olivier van Noort (1558–1627), first Dutchman to circumnavigate the world 
Adriaen Block (c. 1567–1627), the first European to enter Long Island Sound and the Connecticut River and determine that Manhattan and Long Island are islands
Willem Schouten (c. 1567–1625), Dutch explorer, who was first to sail the Cape Horn route to the Pacific Ocean  
Jacob Le Maire (c. 1585–1616), Dutch Flemish explorer 
Abel Janszoon Tasman (1603–1659), the first European to discover New Zealand, Tasmania and Fiji
Willem Barentsz (c. 1550–1597), explorer of the Arctic
Cornelis de Houtman (1565–1599), explorer of the East Indies
Frederick de Houtman (1571–1627), Dutch explorer, elder brother of Cornelis de Houtman 
Willem Janszoon (c. 1570–1630), Dutch navigator and colonial governor, the first European known to have seen the coast of Australia (1606)
Cornelis Nay, explorer of the Arctic
Henry Hudson (c. 1565–1611), Englishman who sailed to the Arctic for the Dutch East India Company

Colonization 
Kiliaen van Rensselaer (before 1596–after 1643), co-founder of the Dutch West India Company and first patroon of Rensselaerswyck
Jan Pieterszoon Coen (1587–1629), Governor-General of the Dutch East Indies
Peter Stuyvesant (c. 1612–1672), colonial governor of the New Netherland colony
Jan van Riebeeck (1619–1677), commander of the Cape Colony and founder of Cape Town

Business 
Isaac Le Maire (1558–1624), largest shareholder in the VOC
Louis De Geer (1587–1652), Walloon/Dutch merchant, considered the father of Swedish industry 
Pieter de la Court (1618–1685), Dutch economist and businessman
Joseph de la Vega (1650–1692), Amsterdam's Jewish merchant

Politics 
Maurice of Nassau, Prince of Orange (1567–1625), stadtholder
Frederik Hendrik, Prince of Orange (1584–1647), stadtholder
Willem III van Oranje (1650–1702), King-Stadtholder
Johan van Oldenbarnevelt (1547–1619), statesman who played an important role in the Dutch struggle for independence from Spain
Jan de Witt (1625–1672), statesman who played an important role in the Dutch Golden Age
Cornelis de Graeff (1599–1664), Amsterdam regent who played an important role in the Dutch Golden Age
Andries de Graeff (1611–1678), Amsterdam regent who ruled the city after the death of his brother Cornelis
Agatha Welhouk (1637–1715), central figure in 17th-century court case and daughter of Delft's mayor
Nicolaes Witsen (1641–1717), Dutch statesman who was mayor of Amsterdam thirteen times, between 1682-1706

Military 

Maarten Tromp (1598–1653), admiral
Cornelis Tromp (1629–1691), admiral,  commander-in-chief of the Dutch and Danish navies
Michiel de Ruyter (1607–1676), admiral in the Anglo-Dutch Wars
Cornelis Jol (1597–1641), admiral and privateer
Cornelius Cruys (1655–1727), Dutch Vice Admiral of the Imperial Russian Navy and the first commander of the Russian Baltic Fleet

References

Dutch Golden Age
 
Golden Age
Dutch Golden Age